Carol Benesch  (January 9, 1822, Jägerndorf, Austro-Hungarian Empire, today Krnov, Czech Republic - October 30, 1896, Bucharest, Romania) was a Silesian architect of Historicism and Eclecticism orientation established in the Kingdom of Romania.

He was the father of Oscar Benes (1866-1925), chief architect of Bârlad.

In different documents his name is spelled Carl Benesch, Carol Benisch, Carl Benisch, Carol Beneș, Carl Beneș, Carol Beniș, Carl Beniș.

Education and career
Benesch studied architecture in Vienna. Shortly after graduation he was asked by Prince Nicolae Bibescu-Brâncoveanu to come to Wallachia, where he became an architect in Bucharest.
 
In 1865 he was nominated Chief Architect of the City of Bucharest.

Benesch was founding member and first vice-president of The Architects Society in Romania (Societatea Arhitecților din România) (1891-1892).

Significant buildings 
 Peleș Castle - Sinaia
 St. Joseph's Cathedral (Catedrala Sfântul Iosif), Roman Catholic Cathedral - Bucharest - 1873-1884
 Domnița Bălașa Church - Bucharest 1885
 Brâncovenesc Hospital (Spitalul Brâncovenesc) - Bucharest 1881-1885
 Cathedral of Saints Peter and Paul, Constanța - 1883-1885
 Asylum Elena Doamna (Azilul Elena Doamna) - Bucharest 1862-1870
 Reconstruction of Tismana Monastery - Gorj County - 1855
 Reconstruction of Bistrița Monastery - Vâlcea County - 1855
 Reconstruction of Arnota Monastery - Vâlcea County - 1851

Awards and honors
In recognition of his personal service to the Holy See and the Church, for his works of the St. Joseph's Cathedral (Catedrala Sfântul Iosif), in 1881, Benesch was awarded by Pope Leo XIII with the Pontifical Equestrian Order of St. Gregory the Great, Knight Commander KCSG, being named Carol Vallaquiensi (Carol of/from Wallachia).

Benesch received his Romanian citizenship by decree from King Carol I of Romania, who waived the usual lengthy process.

Death 
Benesch died on October 30, 1896. He is buried in the Catholic wing of the Bellu cemetery in Bucharest.

Notes

References 
Paul Constantin, Universal Dictionary of Architects  (Dicționar Universal al Arhitecților), București, Editura Stiințifică si Enciclopedică, 1986 p. 39.

External links
 Monuments of the Old Bucharest.
 Domnița Bălașa Church.

1822 births
1896 deaths
Romanian architects
Burials at Bellu Cemetery
19th-century Romanian architects
People from Krnov